Madison County Transit, or MCT for short, is a bus and bike trail transportation system that serves the citizens of Madison County, which is located in Illinois approximately  northeast of St. Louis. It was created in 1980 by the Madison County Board to improve transportation in Madison County, and is a completely separate transit system from the St. Louis Metro Transit system which includes MetroLink, which doesn't operate into Madison County, though the buses connect with many MetroBus routes and even serve MetroLink stations in East St. Louis, Belleville and Downtown St. Louis.

Services
Madison County Transit operates a fleet of 89 buses on 28 routes, carries 10,000 riders daily, 220,000 monthly, and 2.6 million riders annually. It includes an express bus service from towns across Madison County to downtown St. Louis, cross county bus service for long-distance services within the county, and shuttle bus service, as well as a paratransit bus service known as ACT (Agency for Community Transit) or Runabout.

In 2008, MCT gave out Summer Break Youth Bus Passes to over 22,000 students ages 12–18. Illinois Public Act 095-0708 became effective in February 2008, allowing all elderly/disabled people to ride bus service for free. All buses are equipped with bike racks, wheelchair lifts, handicapped seats, and security cameras. Buses can lower to ground level, giving easier access to elderly/disabled people.

Route list

MCT Local Routes (bus routes that only operate in Madison County) 
1 Riverbend
2 Granite City Shuttle 
4 Madison-Edwardsville 
6 Roxana-Pontoon Beach 
7 Alton-Edwardsville 
8 Central Shuttle
9 Washington Shuttle
10 State & Elm Shuttle
11 Brown Shuttle
12 Bethalto Shuttle
13 Troy-Glen Carbon 
13X Highland-SIUE Express 
15 East Collinsville
16 Edwardsville-Glen Carbon Shuttle
17 Cougar Shuttle
19 Edwardsville-Collinsville 
20 Granite City-Pontoon Beach Shuttle
21 West Collinsville Shuttle
22 University Shuttle
23 Gateway Commerce Center Shuttle
24X Riverbend-Gateway Commerce Center Express
25X Collinsville-Gateway Commerce Center Express

MCT Regional Routes (bus routes that travel to and from St. Louis or St. Clair County) 
1X Riverbend Express
5 Tri-City Regional
14X Highland Express
16X Edwardsville-Glen Carbon Express
18 Collinsville Regional
20 Gateway Commerce Center Express

Special Service
Muny Express

Bus stations
Madison County Transit has five bus stations where each branch of service converge.
Alton Station
Collinsville Station
Edwardsville Station
Granite City Station
Wood River Station

Fixed Route Bus Ridership

The ridership statistics shown here are of fixed route services only and do not include demand response.

Bike trails
The MCT Trails System was born in the early 1990s, to preserve rail corridors for future light rail possibilities and interim trail use. Madison County Transit is the only transit system in the country with an integrated bus and bikeway system.

Trail list
 MCT Bluff Trail = 
 MCT Confluence Trail = 
 MCT Goshen Trail = 
 MCT Ronald J. Foster Heritage Trail = 
 MCT Nature Trail = 
 MCT Nickel Plate Trail = 
 MCT Quercus Grove Trail = 
 MCT Schoolhouse Trail = 
 MCT Troy Trail = 
 MCT Watershed Trail =

Plans

Light rail
Madison County Transit is working together with the Bi-State Development Agency about the future Mass Transit in Greater St. Louis. There is a possibly to expand bus rapid transit and light rail routes to Granite City and Edwardsville.  In 2005 a study was conducted by East-West Gateway Council of Governments to examine the possibilities of extending a light rail into Madison County showed positive results. In 1997, voters in Madison County rejected a ½ cent sales tax which would have made Madison County next on the list of planned St. Louis MetroLink lines after the 3rd phase of the MetroLink's St. Clair County Extension was complete. This phase would extend the line 5.3 miles east from its current terminus at the Shiloh-Scott Station to MidAmerica Airport. Originally, this was part of the second phase's plan, but its own phase was later created due to low ridership projections, as of 2021 the expansion is currently projected to be finished by 2024 as a part of Gov. J.B. Pritzker's $45 billion Rebuild Illinois Capital Program, which awarded a $96 million grant toward the extension of MetroLink's mainline about 5.5 miles to a new passenger station at the airport.

References

External links

 Madison County Transit
 MCT Trails

 
Transportation in Madison County, Illinois
Public transportation in Greater St. Louis
Public transportation in the Metro East
Bus transportation in Illinois
Bus transportation in Missouri
Transit agencies in Illinois
Transit agencies in Missouri
Paratransit services in the United States
Rail trails in Illinois